Kazantsevo is a rural locality (a village) in Chernushinsky District, Perm Krai, Russia. The population was 31 as of 2010. There are 4 streets.

Geography 
Kazantsevo is located 41 km northeast of Chernushka (the district's administrative centre) by road. Olkhovka is the nearest rural locality.

References 

Rural localities in Chernushinsky District